Kehunia is a village about 10 km from Narkatiaganj and 40 km from Bettiah in the West Champaran district of Bihar state in northern India.

Demographics
As of 2011 India census, Kehunia had a population of 4866 in 1032 households. Males constitute 51.13% of the population and females 48.86%. Kehunia has an average literacy rate of 49.48%, lower than the national average of 74%: male literacy is 59.5%, and female literacy is 40.4%.

Famous personalities 
Krishna Kumar Mishra - Politician 
Rajnish Mishra - Film Director 
Anurag kumar Mishra-Son of India ( Activist )
Manisha Mishra - Bhojpuri Actress and Dancer
Rajesh Mishra - Advocate 
Vishal Kumar Mishra - Social Activist 
Anil Kumar Mishra - Contractor 
Prof. Manoranjan Kumar Mishra - Allen IIT physics faculty 
Shivani Mishra - Anchor

References

https://www.imdb.com/name/nm9331458/
Villages in West Champaran district